This is a complete list of episodes for the Japanese anime series Yu-Gi-Oh! Duel Monsters GX (changed to simply Yu-Gi-Oh! GX in the 4Kids dub, due to the previous anime not using "Duel Monsters" in the title), based on the Yu-Gi-Oh! Duel Monsters anime.

There are four different music themes set accompanying the opening animation and ending credits. For episodes 1-33, they are Rising Weather Hallelujah for the opening animation and Genkai Battle for the ending credits. From episode 34 through to episode 104 they are 99% and WAKE UP YOUR HEART respectively, episodes 105-156 contained Teardrop and The Sun, and for the final episodes, 157 to 180, they were Precious Time, Glory Days and Endless Dream. When dubbed into English they were all replaced by the same song, Get Your Game On!!, by 4Kids Entertainment. The fourth season was not dubbed into English by 4Kids, due to the pressure to begin airing Yu-Gi-Oh! 5D's before the end of 2008.

Series overview

Episode list

Season 1: Seven Stars Saga (2004–05)

Season 2: Society of Light Saga (2005–06)

Season 3: Dimension World Saga (2006–07)

Season 4: Darkness Saga (2007–08)

DVD releases

Region 1 (North America)

The release in America was the 4Kids Entertainment dubbed version that was aired on American television on Cartoon Network, 4KidsTV, The CW4Kids, and on Canadian television on YTV. It is released by FUNimation Entertainment. The series is now being released through New Video Group in the form of season box sets.

Region 2 (UK)

The release in UK was the 4Kids Entertainment dubbed version that was aired on television on CITV, ITV2 on the GMTV2 block,  ITV4 on the GMTV2 block and Nicktoons. It is released by Contender Entertainment. On July 5, 2016  the UK based Anime distributor company, Manga Entertainment, announced they'd release the entire first season of Yugioh GX on DVD,  being released November 21, 2016, followed swiftly by a second Season release during February 2017 and an upcoming release of the entire third season in June 2017.

Region 2 (Japan)

The release in Japan was the original Japanese dubbed version that was aired on television on TV Tokyo. It is released by Record Hanbaimo.

Region 2 (Denmark)

Region 4 (Australia)

The release in Australia was the 4Kids Entertainment dubbed version that was aired on television on Cartoon Network. It is released by Magna.

References

GX *
Yu-Gi-Oh! GX